Centre for Instrument Development (aka CID) is a multidisciplinary research group / centre that is part of the Department of Physics, University of Colombo, Sri Lanka. It offers technical courses in certificate, diploma, undergraduate and postgraduate levels.

History 
CID is founded by Professor T R Ariyaratne in 2000, with the financial support from the International Science Programs, Uppsala University, Sweden, and Prof. D U J Sonnadara, Dr. M K Jayananda, Dr. R Lelwala were the first members of the CID while Prof. T R Ariyaratne becomes the first and current director of the CID. 
The first major activity of the CID, "Microcontroller Training Course [MTC]" was initiated by Dr. R Lelwala [coordinater], Mr. Prasan Hettiarachchi and Mr. Navinda Kottege in 2004. Later, the course was renamed as "Training Course in Microcontroller Programming and its applications", and still uses the code name MTC followed by the year. The first research activity of the CID was started by Prof. Sonnadara and Dr. M K Jayananda with Mr. Wasantha [the first M.Phil. degree holder from the CID], on reconfigurable computing. 
In 2004, Mr. D I Amarasinghe [the second M.Phil. degree holder] started research work on Computational Physics with Prof. D U J Sonnadara, while Mr. Prasan Hettiarachchi and Mr. Nishshanka Jayawantha started research project on grain drying under low humid environment. In 2005, CID was moved to the second floor of the Physics Department Building [the current location]. Mr. Asanga Indunil, Mr. Nishantha Randunu and Mr. Hiran H E Jayaweera are holding the honor of being the first Research Assistants appointed under the CID in 2005 and they organized a national workshop called "Workshop on Emerging Technologies and Sri Lankan Perspectives" in 2005. It was extremely successful workshop and many scientist and researchers were contributed in the workshop. The guest invitees of the workshop were Professor Sune Svanberg and Professor Katerina Svanberg from the Lund University, Sweden.

Research
Major Research Areas
Postharvest technology
Electronic Instrumentation
Drying
Optical spectroscopy
Computational physics
Reconfigurable computing

Courses offered 
 M.Sc. in Applied Electronics
 Embedded System Laboratory
 Microcontrollers and Embedded Systems
 Certificate Course on Applied Electronics and Automation Technology
 Training Course on Microcontroller Programming and its Applications
 Workshop on Computer aided PCB designing
 Workshop on Electronic Design Automation
 Workshop on Scientific Writing Disciplines
 Workshop on using LMS

Personnel

Products
CID-SRM 1.0

External links
Official Site
Embedded System Laboratory - Students' pages

University of Colombo
Research institutes in Sri Lanka